Measure of a Man is a song written by Cathy Dennis, produced by Stephen Lipson and recorded by Pop Idol contestants Sam Nixon and Mark Rhodes, collectively known as Sam & Mark, in 2003. It was released as a double A-side single with "With a Little Help from My Friends" and peaked at number 1 in the United Kingdom. The song was also recorded by  American Idol runner-up Clay Aiken in the same year for his first solo album of the same name. Aiken's album made it to number One on the Billboard top 200.

Track listing
"With a Little Help from My Friends" - 3:08
"Measure of a Man" - 4:00
"With a Little Help from My Friends" (music video)

Charts

Clay Aiken version

Clay Aiken released the track on his debut album five months after the conclusion of second season of American Idol. The album of the same name debuted at number one on the Billboard 200. It sold 613,000 copies in its first week. It was number one on the Billboard 200 for two consecutive weeks and received a Multi-Platinum certification November 17, 2003.

References

2004 singles
UK Singles Chart number-one singles
Sam & Mark songs
Songs written by Cathy Dennis
Song recordings produced by Stephen Lipson
19 Recordings singles
2004 songs